Lindigia may refer to:
 Lindigia (ammonite), a fossil genus of ammonite in the family Heteroceratidae
 Lindigia (fly), an unaccepted genus of flies in the family Tachinidae; synonym of Oharamyia
 Lindigia (plant), a genus of mosses in the family Brachytheciaceae